Chris McGuinness (born 1992 in Belfast, Northern Ireland) is an Irish sportsperson. He plays hurling with his local club O'Donovan Rossa and has been a member of the Antrim senior inter-county hurling team since 2011.

References

1992 births
Living people
Antrim inter-county hurlers
Sportspeople from Belfast
O'Donovan Rossa (Antrim) hurlers